The Soviet Union's 1987 nuclear test series was a group of 24 nuclear tests conducted in 1987. These tests  followed the 1985 Soviet nuclear tests series and preceded the 1988 Soviet nuclear tests series.

References

1987
1987 in the Soviet Union
1987 in military history
Explosions in 1987